Luiz Fernando Pongelupe Machado (born 20 February 1988), simply known as Luiz Fernando is a Brazilian professional footballer who plays for Santa Cruz as a goalkeeper.

Club career
Fernando spent 14 years at the Corinthians. After being released by the club, he joined Red Bull Brasil. He made his 100th appearance for the club against Rio Branco-SP. In that season, he went 316 minutes without conceding a goal. In the match against Rio Branco, he made "two great saves". After playing for a number of clubs as well returning to his former club, Fernando embraced Cypriot football with Doxa Katokopias in 2014.

On 11 January 2015, he embraced Asian football signing for Yangon United of Myanmar.

References

External links
 

1988 births
Living people
Association football goalkeepers
Brazilian footballers
Footballers from São Paulo
Red Bull Brasil players
Boa Esporte Clube players
Marília Atlético Clube players
Doxa Katokopias FC players
Campeonato Brasileiro Série B players
Cypriot First Division players
Yangon United F.C. players
Brazilian expatriate footballers
Brazilian expatriate sportspeople in Cyprus
Brazilian expatriate sportspeople in Myanmar